Vicious Rumors is an American power metal band from Santa Rosa, California. Formed in August 1979, the group originally consisted of lead vocalist Mark Tate, guitarists Geoff Thorpe and Jim Cassero, bassist Jeff Barnacle, and drummer Bryan Hurt. By the time the band recorded its first album Soldiers of the Night in 1985, the lineup consisted of Thorpe alongside vocalist Gary St. Pierre, guitarist Vinnie Moore, bassist Dave Starr and drummer Larry Howe. The current lineup of Vicious Rumors features Thorpe and Howe alongside guitarist Gunnar DüGrey (since 2017), bassist Robin Utbult (since 2020) and vocalist Ronny Munroe (since 2022).

History

1979–1995
Geoff Thorpe formed Vicious Rumors in August 1979 after moving to Santa Rosa to pursue a musical career. The band's original lineup included vocalist Mark Tate, guitarist Jim Cassero and bassist Jeff Barnacle. Bryan Hurt was the group's first drummer, although he left the year after its formation and was replaced by Walt Perkins. During the early 1980s, the band contributed songs to various compilation albums – "I Can Live Forever" on KMEL's New Oasis in 1982, "Ultimate Death" on Shrapnel's US Metal Vol. III with new drummer Jim Lang in 1983, and "One Way Ticket" to US Metal Vol. IV with new vocalist Gary St. Pierre, guitarist Chuck Moomey and drummer Don Selzer in 1984. The group's appearances on the Shrapnel releases led to them signing a two-album deal with the label.

With a lineup of St. Pierre and Thorpe alongside guitarist Vinnie Moore, bassist Dave Starr and drummer Larry Howe, Vicious Rumors released its full-length debut Soldiers of the Night in 1985. According to Starr, Moore left immediately after the album was recorded, claiming he "was not happy with us, or the band, the music, the whole situation". He was replaced for the subsequent tour by Larry Montana. In November 1986, Carl Albert and Mark McGee replaced St. Pierre and Montana, respectively. Speaking about the personnel changes, Starr has recalled that St. Pierre "wasn't showing up for band practice" and Montana simply "wasn't working out".

With Albert and McGee in place, Vicious Rumors released Digital Dictator in 1988, Vicious Rumors in 1990, Welcome to the Ball in 1991, and their first live album Plug In and Hang On: Live in Tokyo in 1992. In late 1993, Starr left the band. The bassist claims that he initially stepped back from the band to care for his wife that summer, before Thorpe fired him just a few weeks later. Starr was replaced by Tommy Sisco, a former bandmate of Albert's in a group called Villain. Word of Mouth followed in 1994. In early 1995, McGee announced his departure from Vicious Rumors due to musical differences, later joining Gregg Allman's band the Alameda All Stars.

1995–2013
McGee was replaced by Steve Smyth, however just a few weeks after his arrival, frontman Carl Albert died in a car accident. The group went on a brief hiatus and released A Tribute to Carl Albert later that year, featuring live tracks recorded on a European tour in 1994. In 1996, Vicious Rumors returned with Something Burning, on which Thorpe performed lead vocals in lieu of a replacement for Albert. The group toured in promotion of the release as a four-piece before replacing Albert in 1997 with Brian O'Connor. After the release and promotion of 1998's Cyberchrist, Vicious Rumors entered a period of inactivity as "band members began leaving in 1999" according to Smyth, who joined Testament that September.

During 2000, the band recorded Sadistic Symphony with new vocalist Morgan Thorn, guitarist Ira Black, bassist Chris "Cornbread" Lombardo, and session drummer Atma Anur. Shortly after the album's release, O'Connor returned in Thorn's place, while Dan Lawson joined on drums. From 2002, the band toured with Will Carroll in Lawson's place. After releasing a demo called Immortal in 2004, the band announced the return of Larry Howe on drums in January 2005. More lineup changes occurred later in the year – Lombardo left in April, replaced for tour dates that summer by predecessor Tommy Sisco, O'Connor quit in August, and Dave Starr returned as new permanent bassist in September. In November, the group unveiled Helstar frontman James Rivera and Night Ranger guitarist Brad Gillis as new members.

In March 2006, Gillis was temporarily replaced by Thaen Rasmussen, as he was unable to tour due to family commitments. Gillis did not return, however, and Rasmussen continued touring with the band for the next two years. In January 2007, Starr left for a second time to focus on his side project WildeStarr. He was replaced the next month by Stephen Goodwin. At the end of a tour of Europe in November, both Rivera and Rasmussen left the band, with the vocalist claiming that an altercation with Geoff Thorpe led to their departure. Rivera claimed that Vicious Rumors was "over", but the band responded by saying that it would continue.

Former Shadowkeep vocalist Ronnie Stixx replaced Rivera in February 2008, while Kiyoshi Morgan took over from Thasmussen the month after. Stixx remained until December 2009, when he was replaced by Brian Allen. The new lineup released Razorback Killers in 2011. Before the end of the year, Rasmussen returned and the group recorded Live You to Death. During 2012, the band played with Bob Capka as its second touring guitarist.

Since 2013
During May and June 2013, James Rivera temporarily returned in place of regular vocalist Brian Allen, who had to sit out a tour due to "sudden family matters". By July, Allen had been permanently replaced by Nick Holleman, while Stephen Goodwin had also made way for Tilen Hudrap. The new lineup debuted on Live You to Death 2: American Punishment, recorded in the fall. During the band's 2015 tour dates, Capka was replaced again by Thaen Rasmussen. Concussion Protocol was released in August 2016. The following May, the band announced the return of Allen on vocals and the addition of new guitarist Gunnar DüGrey. In July 2018, the group replaced Allen again with Nick Courtney.

A few months after Courtney's arrival, Vicious Rumors began touring with new bassist Cody Green in place of Hudrap, who had joined Pestilence. In 2020, the band released Celebration Decay, on which bass was performed by Greg Christian. Bassist Robin Utbult became a live member before the album's touring cycle and was confirmed after the recording.

Members

Current

Former

Timeline

Lineups

References

External links
Vicious Rumors official website

Vicious Rumors